The fifth series of Promi Big Brother (also known as Promi Big Brother – Alles oder Nichts) started on 11 August 2017. It is the fifth series of the Big Brother franchise on Sat.1, after it left RTL II.

Jochen Schropp and Jochen Bendel co-host this season.  Jens Hilbert was the winner.

Format 
Promis had participated in tasks and matches for treats or to avoid punishments. Daily nominations also took place (from Day 10 to 16). Furthermore, the house consists of two areas, the luxurious area and the poor area. Housemates on the luxurious area will choose of the poor housemates to join them, whilst the public will vote one of them move to poor area.

House
This year's Promi Big Brother contains two areas: the luxurious Everything area, and the poor Nothing area.  Each area having their separate living areas, bathrooms, bedrooms and diary rooms. The Everything area will be luxurious, whilst the Nothing area is meager with no beds or real seating. Both areas are on the same level.

Housemates

Distribution of housemates
As in the last three seasons, the participants were distributed before the broadcast of the show by the producers in the respective areas. From the first show, the participants and the audience could change the distribution of the housemates in each case by voting and using the Duel Arena.

Duel Arena
As in the previous duels between the Duels also took place this year. Big Brother (voiced by Phil Daub) each appoint one or two residents from the "area" who must compete at the Duel Arena. In the Duel Arena they both played a game and the loser must face the consequences for his living area. A draw always win the inhabitants in the "luxury area". The duels each can either have a positive impact on the winners section or consequences for the loser section. So must for example, the losing team changing areas, receives less food or have to give personal items.

: Sarah Knappik was chosen by the viewers, but she could not participate for health reasons. Instead, Claudia participated for her.
: Zachi was chosen by the viewers, but he could not participate for health reasons. Instead, Dominik participated for him.

Nominations table
 – Everything Housemates after week 1
 – Nothing Housemates after week 1
 – This round of nominations were to save.

Notes 

: All female housemates were immune from nomination.
: Housemates were only allowed to nominate people in their living area. The housemate with the most votes from each living area will face the public vote.
: Housemates had to choose a housemate to save from the public vote rather than nominate. The housemate with the fewest votes to be save would be nominated.
: Eloy won the live duel on 23 August. As a reward, he won immunity which he could transfer to another housemate. He chose to give Dominik immunity.
: Willi lost the live duel on 23 August. He received a killer nomination which could transfer to another housemate. He chose to killer nominate Milo.
: Willi became the first finalist after winning the duel on Day 16.
: The public were voting to win rather than to save.

Ratings

References

External links 
Official Homepage

2017 German television seasons
05